John Dyke (6 January 1803 – 1 August 1885) was an English cricketer who played for Kent. He was born in Lullingstone and died in Sittingbourne.

Dyke made a single first-class appearance for a Kent side in 1822, playing against MCC. Despite scoring a duck in the first innings of the match, he scored 35 runs in the second innings of the match, the second highest score of the innings.

Dyke's brothers, Percyvall and Thomas, and nephew Edwin Dyke, all played first-class cricket, as well as his brother-in-law Herbert Jenner-Fust.

References

1803 births
1885 deaths
English cricketers
Kent cricketers
English cricketers of 1787 to 1825
People from Lullingstone